Press Play ApS was a Danish video game development studio based in central Copenhagen in Denmark. Since 2006, Press Play have released five titles, including the Max & the Magic Marker, Max: The Curse of Brotherhood and Kalimba.

In 2012 the studio was acquired by Microsoft and Press Play was then part of the Microsoft Studios family along with other studios like 343 Industries, Rare, Lionhead Studios, Turn 10 Studios and Twisted Pixel Games. On March 7, 2016, Microsoft announced the plan to close Press Play, and their title, Knoxville, was cancelled. On March 10, 2016, Press Play was officially closed by Microsoft Studios. After the closure, the founders of Press Play founded a new studio called Flashbulb Games, and is working on a new sandbox game called Trailmakers.

On November 10, 2016, Flashbulb acquired Press Play and its library of games to republish under the Flashbulb name, including Kalimba, Tentacles: Enter the Mind, and Max: The Curse of Brotherhood.

Games

References

External links

Former Microsoft subsidiaries
Video game development companies
Danish companies established in 2006
Video game companies established in 2006
Video game companies disestablished in 2016
Defunct video game companies of Denmark
Video game companies based in Copenhagen
2016 disestablishments in Denmark